Dorothy Summers (born 29 September 1941) is a British gymnast. She competed in six events at the 1960 Summer Olympics.

References

1941 births
Living people
British female artistic gymnasts
Olympic gymnasts of Great Britain
Gymnasts at the 1960 Summer Olympics
Sportspeople from Cardiff